Umayanaloor is a village near Mayyanad in the Kollam District, Kerala, located near the western coast of the southern tip of India.

Overview 

Umayanalloor is a village in the Mayyanad panchayat, and is situated in the South Kerala Division. It acts as a junction on the Kollam-Thiruvananthapuram road (part of NH-47). Kottiyam and other places are connected to Umayanalloor. Malayalam is the native language of Umayanalloor.

The pin code of Naduvilakara, Umayanalloor, and Mayyanad is 691589.

Education

The closest LP School is in Vazhappalli. There are also unaided LP schools in Umayanaloor, namely Rose Dale, AKMHS, BED college, Cherupushpam LPS, PVUPS, and the EEGA study center.

Economy

Agriculture 
Paddy rice farming and milk production are the main farming sectors in the village. The production of cashew nuts is also common.

Industry 
Umayanalloor boasts several cashew nut processing plants, as well as an industrial estate consisting mainly of snack factories. The village also has ice cream factories and old wooden furniture shops.

Banking 
Branches of larger banks, such as the Umayanallor Service Co-operation Bank, the Federal Bank, and Muthoot Finance can be found in Umayanalloor.

Politics 

Umayanalloor is part of the Eravipuram assembly constituency in Kollam (Lok Sabha constituency), with M. Noushad being the current MLA of Eravipuram. N. K. Premachandran is the current Member of Parliament from Kollam.

Religion

There are many and diverse centers of worship in Umayanalloor. These include the Balasubramanya Swami Temple, Durgapuri Sree Madankovil Temple, Valiyaveettil Nujumudeen Masjid, Salafi Masjid Mosque, Umayanalloor Mosque, and Amalothbhava Matha Church.

References

Geography of Kollam district